Karpunin is a rural locality (a khutor) in Lebyazhenskoye Rural Settlement, Kamyshinsky District, Volgograd Oblast, Russia. The population was 164 as of 2010. There are 6 streets.

Geography 
Karpunin is located in steppe, on the Volga Upland, on the Kamyshinka River, 9 km northwest of Kamyshin (the district's administrative centre) by road. Sredyaya Kamyshinka is the nearest rural locality.

References 

Rural localities in Kamyshinsky District